Havoc is a 1925 American silent war drama film directed by Rowland V. Lee and starring Madge Bellamy, George O'Brien, and Walter McGrail.

Plot
As described in a film magazine reviews, in England before the outbreak of the First World War, Captain Roddy Dunton and Lieutenant Dick Chappel court the same woman, Violet Deering. She becomes engaged to Dunton, and Chappel accepts her choice. On leave from the British Army on the Western Front, Chappel brings Violet a message from Dunton. Violet infatuates him and Dunton's sister Tessie sees them embrace. Violet, trapped, breaks her engagement with Dunton. When Chappel returns to the trenches, Dunton, angered, persuades Chappel to take part in a reckless attack on the German lines, hoping he will be killed. Instead, the brave Chappel is badly wounded. Later, full of remorse, Dunton shoots himself, committing suicide. Chappel returns home where he denounces Violet and is nursed back to health by Dunton's sister Tessie.

Cast

References

Bibliography
 Solomon, Aubrey. The Fox Film Corporation, 1915-1935: A History and Filmography. McFarland, 2011.

External links

1925 films
1925 war films
American war drama films
Films directed by Rowland V. Lee
American silent feature films
Fox Film films
Films set in England
Films set in London
American World War I films
American black-and-white films
1925 drama films
1920s English-language films
1920s American films
Silent American drama films
Silent war drama films